Unionville is a suburban district and former village in Markham, Ontario, Canada, 2 km (2.5 mi) west of Markham Village (the City of Markham's historic downtown), and 33 km (20.5 mi) northeast of Downtown Toronto. The boundaries of Unionville are not well-defined. Several neighbourhoods claim to be part of it however, this has been disputed between the various wards.

Unionville was founded north of 16th Avenue in 1794, and many of the farms on and around Kennedy Road. The Unionville Ratepayers Association designated a newer street, Rodick Road, as its western boundary, in the 1980s. Main Street Unionville, which was Kennedy Road in the mid-to-late 20th century, runs through Unionville while the new Kennedy Road runs  to the east. Rouge River runs north of the central part of Unionville and to the southeast. Unionville is predominantly residential except for the south central industrial area, which is slated for massive intensification.

Tourism is a major part of Unionville's economy. The village itself still resembles the small town that developed over a century or so starting in the early 1840s (when Ira White erected his Union Mills) through the middle to late 20th century. Now a 'heritage conservation district', it attracts thousands of visitors each year — as of 2006 it boasted nine restaurants, including three pubs. Main Street (originally the laneway from the village's first grist mill) also has a number of "century homes" dating back to the 19th century. Each year, thousands of people visit Unionville during the Unionville Festival.

The main street has been a stand-in for fictional Connecticut town Stars Hollow during the first season of Gilmore Girls television show, and for other television and movie backdrops.

Most of the historic buildings in Unionville are included in List of historic buildings in Markham, Ontario.

History
Unionville's name was derived from American-born Ira Allen White's Union Mills built in 1839, which in turn was named for the Act of Union 1840 of Upper Canada and Lower Canada. White would remain in the area at least up to 1860 but by 1878 his property as per York County Atlas belong to Hugh Powell Crosby as White moved to Yarmouth, Ontario were he died in 1887 (but buried in Cedar Grove Mennonite Cemetery Markham).

William von Moll Berczy brought the first settlers to Markham Township in 1794; they were originally from Germany but first moved to New York State. After arriving here, they acquired large tracts of land near current day Berczy Village at 16th Avenue and Kennedy Road.

Illness and famine in 1795–1796 reduced the population but the others remained on the develop a settlement:

 Johann Niclaus Stober or John Stiver was another Berczy settler who is descendant of Charles and Francis Stiver whom established Stiver Mills
 Philip Eckardt who is a Berczy settler who descendant farmed lands in Markham. Eckardt is tied to the Bethesda Lutheran Church

By 1851, the population was 200, served by a grist mill, a saw mill and two churches (Primitive Methodist and Presbyterian).

Unionville was a police village within what was then Markham Township within York County until the end of 1970, at which time the county was reorganized into Regional Municipality of York. Unionville and the two other police villages in the township (Buttonville and Thornhill) as well as the Village of Markham were abolished and amalgamated with Markham Township, which was reincorporated as the Town of Markham (changed to city in 2012), with some of the township's lands being ceded to neighbouring Richmond Hill and Whitchurch–Stouffville. The town and the township were named after two different people named "Markham".

A historic concrete bridge carrying Unionville Main Street was built by Octavius Hicks in 1909.

The name "Unionville" remained a valid postal address until the early 1990s at which time most addresses were changed to "Markham". In 2009, Markham Town Council reinstated the name "Unionville" for that portion of postal addresses within its Ward 3, which lies between Warden, 16th, McCowan and the 407. However, the Post Office used "Unionville" as the postal address for a larger delivery area that included the farms and later urban areas that it considered to be "in Unionville". Unionville's historical boundaries, therefore, may be based on the historic Post Office delivery area for the name "Unionville". These varied somewhat over a century and a half, as neighbouring post offices came and went, but at some time or other the following areas had a "Unionville" address:

 Highway 7 and southward: all of the area north of Steeles between Woodbine on the west and McCowan on the east, including both sides of Woodbine, McCowan and Highway 7.
 North of Highway 7: all of the area to 19th Avenue between Warden on the west and McCowan on the east, including both sides of Woodbine, McCowan and 19th.

Unionville has six postal codes, L3P, L3R, L3S, L6C, L6E, and L6G, in its postal service area.

Based on the boundaries for Milliken, Unionville's southern boundary is Highway 407. It is commonly seen as extending westward to Highway 404.

In the 1960s, major housing development came to Unionville and is still ongoing. Having old buildings available at low cost, a number of antique stores sprang up and for a while in the 1970s Unionville ranked high on the list of places to go to get antiques. After the commitment to a bypass was realised, in the 1970s, entrepreneurs appeared. The Old Country Inn opened for business and Old Firehall Sports brought a new clientele to the village. Over the next decades, the typical antique places disappeared, being replaced by higher-end antique and replica outlets, restaurants, pubs, and clothing establishments. Tourism was born. Starbucks appeared in the late 1990s. Many of the buildings have been spruced up, extended and upgraded to meet this new reality. The old original road, to the immediate east of Main Street, has been converted to a large parking lot.

Walking paths through the local conservation lands connect directly to the village roads, one of the most used being the path around Toogood Pond, named after the Toogood family – the pond was originally the mill pond that powered the grist mill in the 1840s an created by flooding a section of Bruce Creek. In the early 20th century the pond was called Willow Pond or Willow Lake and was the home to several small summer cottages on north Main Street. Some had been cottages, for grist mill workers, in their earliest incarnation. Those cottages evolved into homes by the middle of the century, but are almost all gone now being replaced by large spacious expensive homes.

The Varley Art Gallery now stands at the north end of the commercial Main Street and is rapidly becoming a gallery of wide renown. It was started with the contributions of Mrs. McKay, who had supported Group of Seven artist Fred Varley for the later part of his life. Living in her home on Main Street Unionville, he did several paintings that are now part of the Art Gallery collection and the home is now part of the Art Gallery's holdings, being used for small art shows on a regular basis.

The Unionville Arms, a well-known pub, burnt down on 30 November 2007. It had been in business for 19 years prior.  The building itself was over a century old. The legendary building caught fire in the morning, supposedly due to a combination of faulty kitchenware and wiring, and the century-old insulation. The fire was put out three hours later.  No one was hurt. The Arms reopened in very much its original appearance, towards the end of December 2008. Another popular pub is Jake's, housed in what used to be the funeral parlour.

The Stiver Mill is a historic building located near the railway tracks on Main Street Unionville. The building was restored in 2014 and is now a community centre. The area around the building has also been modernized for accessibility to both the centre and the train station next to it.

The murder of Bich-Ha Pan and attempted murder of Hann Pan took place in Unionville on 8 November 2010.

Geography
Originally surrounded by farmlands, the village is now surrounded by suburban neighbourhoods. During the transitional period in the 1970s a ban was placed on development for 25 years. In addition to the historic village, today Unionville includes Angus Glen and South Unionville. Some land is still vacant on the lands of York Downs Golf which is slated for massive development in the coming years. The Highway 7 part of Unionville near Village Parkway will feature redevelopment with several mid rise and high rise buildings which will combine a village and an urban character.

Nearest communities
Richmond Hill, west
Stouffville, north
Markham Village, east
Milliken, south

Demographics 
In Unionville, according to Statistics Canada, in the course of five years between 2006 and 2011, the population steadily increased from 7368 to 8906 individuals. In the census data collected, the GNR rate in 2011 appeared as 17.4%.

Generations

According to statistics Canada, Between 2006 and 2011, the increase in 2nd generation Canadian citizens moved from 970 to 2330 individuals. However, for first generations, the increase was not as drastic as 2nd generation citizens. The increase was from 4955 to 6225.

Citizenships

Residents who had legal citizenship in 2006 were 78% and who didn't were 22%. The numbers obtained indicated residents who were 18 years and above. The 2011 data showed similar, showing increase in one percent, indicated 79% of the population containing citizenship.

Arts and culture
Unlike other communities in Markham, Unionville proper does not have a community centre. Crosby Memorial Arena, an indoor rink built in 1928, is the only major sports venue in the area. The arena is named for the Crosby family of Markham Village, who came to Markham in 1806 and established themselves as farmers, landowners and storekeepers. Residents are within driving distance from Angus Glen Community Centre, Markham Pan Am Centre and Milliken Mills Community Centre. 

The Unionville Festival was first organized in 1969 to raise awareness and money to fight the provincial plan to run a four lane road up the middle of the town and thus destroying it. An interest in history, spurred by the Canadian Centennial Year in 1967, awoke the longtime residents and the new subdivision residents. Slowly, local politicians got on board, and a plan was drawn up to divert the road to the east of the historic town center (now known as Kennedy Road). Today the festival continues to offer visitors access to handcrafts, small vendors, live music and community groups. Virtually none of the businesses from the mid-20th century still exist, having been replaced by restaurants and tourist outlets.

The Unionville Business Improvement Area and its merchants, organize and operate numerous, year-round, admission free, festivals and events. The Merchants of Main Street Unionville BIA is the business association on Main Street Unionville, composed of volunteers from the business community, who work to preserve and promote the historical village of Unionville.

The Unionville BIA's Heritage Committee has seen its volunteers research and produce a self-guided walking tour.  They also offer the official walking tours of Main Street Unionville.

Unionville has a number of regular events ongoing throughout the year.  Dates for these can be found on the relevant web sites.  Here is a sampling:
 Unionville Village Festival – first weekend of June
 Unionville Heritage Festival – Labour Day
 Olde Tyme Christmas Candlelight Parade – first Friday of December
 Olde Tyme Christmas Breakfast with Santa – morning after the Parade
 Canada Day – 1 July
 Markham Jazz Festival – August
 Thursday Nights at the Bandstand – all summer long
 Doors Open Markham – usually autumn
 Remembrance Day at the Cenotaph – 11 Nov

Stiver Mills Farmers' Market and Stiver Mills 
Stiver Mill hosts a small farmers' type market ever Sunday from June to October (held indoors in the Mills to December) and operating since 2009. The market was founded by Bob Stiver, a descendant of the Stiver brothers.

The Stiver family has resided in Unionville and Markham since 1794 as part of the wave of migrants brought over by William Berczy.

The market is located next to the historic Stiver Mill, a grain mill built in 1916 (as well as structures moved from Matthew Grain Company of Toronto) for Charles and Francis Stiver and operated as Stiver Brothers until 1968. Besides grains (as well as seed and feed), the business sold cement, coal and salt.

The site was acquired by the then Town of Markham in 1993 and closed from 2013 to 2014 when the mills structure was restored.

Government
Unionville is, or is considered by some to be, within the following administrative units:

 Ward 3, represented by Councilor Reid McAlpine
 Ward 4, represented by Councilor Karen Rea (see discussion of boundaries above)
 Ward 6, represented by Councilor Amanda Yeung Collucci (see discussion of boundaries above)
 Markham—Unionville, provincial electoral riding, represented by Billy Pang (Progressive Conservative Party of Ontario)
 Markham—Unionville, federal electoral riding, represented by Bob Saroya (Conservative Party of Canada)
 Markham, Ontario – mayor Frank Scarpitti
 Regional Municipality of York, regional council chaired by Wayne Emmerson

Infrastructure

Transportation
  Highway 407 ETR
 York Region Transit – bus routes on Highway 7 and 16th Avenue
 Viva – Viva Green and Viva Purple routes
 GO Train/Bus at Unionville GO Station
  Highway 7
 Toronto Transit Commission – bus routes 68 Warden, 43 Kennedy, 17 Birchmount

Education

Primary and secondary schools
York Region District School Board operates Anglophone public secular schools:
 Unionville High School
 Markville Secondary School
 Bill Crothers Secondary School
 Unionville Public School
 William Berczy Public School
 Buttonville Public School
 Central Park Public School
 Coledale Public School
 Parkview Public School

York Catholic District School Board operates Anglophone Catholic public schools:
 St. Augustine Catholic High School
 All Saints Catholic Elementary School
 St. Matthew Catholic Elementary School
 John XXIII Catholic Elementary School
 St. Justin Martyr Catholic Elementary School

Conseil scolaire catholique MonAvenir operates Francophone Catholic public schools:
 Sainte-Marguerite-Bourgeoys French Catholic Elementary School

Private schools:
 Unionville Montessori Private School

Public libraries

A new library, the Markham Public Library (Unionville branch), was completed in 1984, replacing the older Unionville Library, which was renamed the "Old Library Community Centre", and is now used for dance classes, meetings, and a church. The new library occupies 1,300 square metres, and is based on a traditional village square surrounded by eight "houses" of books expressed on the exterior as postmodern Victorian dormers. The library, which contains approximately 100,000 books and audiovisual materials, was designed by architect Barton Myers.

Notable people
 Hayden Christensen of Star Wars fame attended Unionville High School.
 Emmanuelle Chriqui – Canadian actress who appeared in the television series Entourage and the films On the Line, Snow Day, and In the Mix.
 Anna Russell – English–Canadian singer and comedian – Anna Russell Way is named after her.
Steven Stamkos a Canadian ice hockey player of the Tampa Bay Lightning.
Paul Poirier a figure skater. Competed in 2010 Vancouver Winter Olympics.
Howie Lee a Canadian ice hockey player who was a member of the Kitchener-Waterloo Dutchmen who won the bronze medal for Canada in ice hockey at the 1956 Winter Olympics.
 Joe Bowen – Toronto Maple Leafs broadcaster.
 James Duthie – TSN Hockey analyst.
 Ken Pereira – field hockey midfielder.
 Bob Beckett – former Canadian ice hockey centre.
 Andrea Beck – Montreal-born author best known for her Elliot Moose books.
 Donald Deacon – Deacon, OC, O.PEI, MC (1920–2003) was a Canadian politician, businessman and volunteer.  He was made an officer of the Order of Canada in 2003.
 Marc Bendavid – Canadian film, television and stage actor.
 Gillian Apps – women's ice hockey player. She is the granddaughter of Hockey Hall of Fame member Syl Apps and the daughter of former National Hockey League player Syl Apps, Jr. and his wife Anne.

See also
Main Street Unionville
List of historic buildings in Markham, Ontario

References

External links

Unionville 150th: Origins of a Community

Neighbourhoods in Markham, Ontario
Populated places established in 1803